The Blindness of Love is a five-reel silent film directed by Charles Horan from a screenplay by Harry O. Hoyt and Ruth Comfort Mitchell.

Plot 
Julius Steger plays a wealthy old piano maker named Joseph who is blindly devoted to his trouble-making adult son.

Cast 

 Julius Steger as Joseph Wilton
 George Le Guere
 Grace Valentine

References 

1916 films
American black-and-white films
American silent feature films
Silent American drama films
1916 drama films
1910s American films